Sânmartin, Sânmărtin, Sânmartinu or Sânmărtinu may refer to several places in Romania:

Sânmartin, Bihor, a commune in Bihor County
CSC Sânmartin, an association football club
Sânmartin, Cluj, a commune in Cluj County
Sânmartin, Harghita, a commune in Harghita County
Sânmartin, a village in Macea Commune, Arad County
Sânmărtin, a village in Chinteni Commune, Cluj County
Sânmartin de Beiuş, a village in Pocola Commune, Bihor County
Sânmartinu Maghiar, a village in Uivar Commune, Timiș County
Sânmartinu Sârbesc, a village in Peciu Nou Commune, Timiș County
Sânmărtinu de Câmpie and Valea Sânmărtinului, villages in Râciu Commune, Mureș County

See also
St. Martin (disambiguation)
Sankt Martin (disambiguation)